Sucha  is a village in the administrative district of Gmina Grzmiąca, within Szczecinek County, West Pomeranian Voivodeship, in north-western Poland.

For the history of the region, see History of Pomerania.

The village has a population of 386.

Geography
Perznica river

Notable residents
 Gerlach von Gaudecker-Zuch (1909–1970), Wehrmacht officer

References

Sucha